Gerardo Bernal (born 26 June 1989 in Cuernavaca, Morelos) is a Mexican professional footballer who played as a defender for Socio Águila, Ballenas Galeana, Irapuato and Murciélagos.

External links

References

Living people
1989 births
Sportspeople from Cuernavaca
Footballers from Morelos
Association football defenders
Unión de Curtidores footballers
Ballenas Galeana Morelos footballers
Irapuato F.C. footballers
Murciélagos FC footballers
Ascenso MX players
Liga Premier de México players
Mexican footballers